Coco Gauff and Jessica Pegula defeated Nicole Melichar-Martinez and Ellen Perez in the final, 6–4, 6–7(5–7), [10–5] to win the women's doubles tennis title at the 2022 Canadian Open. With the win, Gauff gained the WTA number 1 doubles ranking for the first time, becoming the second-youngest player to attain the No. 1 ranking in history, after Martina Hingis in 1997. Elise Mertens and Zhang Shuai were also in contention for the top ranking.

Gabriela Dabrowski and Luisa Stefani were the reigning champions, but Stefani did not participate due to injury. Dabrowski partnered Giuliana Olmos, but lost in the semifinals to Melichar-Martinez and Perez.

Seeds
The top four seeds received a bye into the second round.

Draw

Finals

Top half

Bottom half

Seeded teams
The following are the seeded teams, based on WTA rankings as of August 1, 2022.

Other entry information

Wild cards

Withdrawals
  Marie Bouzková /  Laura Siegemund (Bouzková – back injury)
  Lucie Hradecká /  Sania Mirza → replaced by  Madison Keys /  Sania Mirza
  Monica Niculescu /  Elena-Gabriela Ruse → replaced by  Vivian Heisen /  Monica Niculescu

References

External links
Main draw

2022 WTA Tour